The CBC Ottawa Production Centre is the headquarters of the Canadian Broadcasting Corporation. The office and studio complex is located on Queen Street in downtown Ottawa, Ontario, Canada. The building hosts the originating studios for both the CBC's English and French language operations in the National Capital Region.

Design and construction 

The Ottawa Production Centre was built by and is owned by Morguard Investments. Not all of it is leased by the CBC, with the top floors occupied by the House of Commons administration (Information Services). It is located at 181 Queen Street, between Bank Street and O'Connor Street (across from the Confederation Line light rail station) in the city's downtown core. The rear of the building backs out on the Sparks Street pedestrian mall. The site had been vacant for several years and had previously been home to a Woolworth's department store.

Eight different CBC News services, consisting of 200 editorial staff in the National Capital Region, operate in both English and French out of the main newsroom to produce content for radio, television and the internet.

The main design feature of the Production Centre is that it appears as a typical multi-storey office building on the Queen Street frontage, whereas the Sparks Street frontage is consistent with the low-rise development on the pedestrian mall. Given the significant terracing of the building's Sparks Street façade above the fourth floor and the grade differential between Queen Street and Sparks Street, the building is 12 storeys on Queen Street, but appears to be only four storeys in height from ground level on Sparks Street.

Although the building was designed to revitalize Sparks Street, critic Rhys Phillips described the building as "just another low-cost, banal building." Visitors and non-CBC employees working on the building's upper floors must access the building from Queen Street, thus directing pedestrians away from the pedestrian mall. A pathway linking the Queen Street lobby to Sparks Street was cut from the original design to make room for a larger newsroom. Councillor Diane Holmes called the building "the biggest disappointment" and "a whole block of deadness."

CBC services based in the building
 Radio
 CBO-FM, CBC Radio One
 CBOF-FM, Ici Radio-Canada Première
 CBOQ-FM, CBC Music
 CBOX-FM, Ici Musique
 Television
 CBOFT-DT, Ici Radio-Canada Télé
 CBOT-DT, CBC Television
 Studios for CBC News Network programming, including Power & Politics

Former CBC offices and studios in Ottawa 
Previously, the CBC operated out of various buildings throughout the city. The radio division occupied the sixth floor of the Château Laurier hotel, while the television division operated out of the Graham Spry Building in the Westboro neighbourhood. The CBC's Parliamentary Bureau operated out of the National Press Building on Wellington Street and the Booth Building on Sparks Street. The CBC head office previously occupied the Edward Drake Building in Ottawa south, but budgetary cutbacks in the 1980s and 1990s led to the sale of that building and to a drastic downsizing of the head office staff. Prior to the opening of the Production Centre, the remaining head office staff shared space with the television operations in the Westboro building.

See also
CBC Ottawa

References

External links
View of the CBC Ottawa Building from street level on Sparks Street
View of the CBC Ottawa Building from above, showing the terracing of the upper floors facing Sparks Street

Ottawa Broadcast Centre
Buildings and structures in Ottawa
Buildings and structures completed in 2004
Office buildings in Canada
Radio studios in Canada
Mass media company headquarters in Canada